Isabel Ashdown (born 1970) is a British writer of contemporary fiction.

Biography
Isabel Ashdown was born in London and grew up in East Wittering on the south coast of England.  She is the author of eight novels, a Royal Literary Fund Fellow, and a member of the Society of Authors. In 2014 she was Writer in Residence at the University of Brighton.

An extract from her debut novel Glasshopper won The Mail on Sunday Novel Competition judged by Fay Weldon and the late Sir John Mortimer, going on to be named as one of the best books of 2009 in the London Evening Standard.

She went on to release a further three novels with Myriad Editions before more recently signing with Trapeze Books, an imprint of the Orion Publishing Group.  Her novel Little Sister (2017) sees the author move into the territory of psychological thriller.

In 2014 her essay Voice and the Inescapable Complexity of Experience was published in Karen Steven's academic anthology Writing a First Novel (Palgrave MacMillan, 2014).

Isabel Ashdown is represented by The Shaw Agency, London.

After fifteen years working in product marketing, Ashdown made the decision to give up her job in senior management to return to education, and she now writes full-time, walks daily, and volunteers in a local school for the charity Pets as Therapy. She is currently a Royal Literary Fund Fellow at the University of Chichester.
Her award-winning debut Glasshopper (Myriad, 2009) was twice named as one of the best books of the year, and her second novel Hurry Up and Wait was published to critical acclaim being listed as one of Amazon Kindle’s Customer Favourites in 2011. Myriad published her third book, Summer of ’76, in 2013, her fourth novel, Flight, in 2015, and A Quiet Winter, an exclusive ebook short story released November 2015. Isabel is also the best-selling author of psychological thrillers Little Sister and Beautiful Liars.

Novels

References

External links
Isabel Ashdown's Official Website

Alumni of the University of Chichester
British women writers
Living people
1970 births
People from Chichester District